The special administrative regions (SAR) of the People's Republic of China are one of the provincial-level autonomous administrative divisions of the People's Republic of China directly under the control of its Central People's Government (State Council), being integral areas of the country. As a region, they possess the highest degree of autonomy from China. However, despite the relative autonomy that the Central People's Government offers the special administrative regions, the National People's Congress remains capable of enforcing laws for the special administrative regions.

The legal basis for the establishment of SARs, unlike the other administrative divisions of China, is provided for by Article 31, rather than Article 30, of the Constitution of the People's Republic of China of 1982. Article 31 reads: "The state may establish special administrative regions when necessary. The systems to be instituted in special administrative regions shall be prescribed by law enacted by the National People's Congress in the light of the specific conditions".

At present, there are two SARs established according to the Constitution, namely the Hong Kong SAR and the Macau SAR, former British and Portuguese dependencies, respectively, transferred to China in 1997 and 1999, respectively, pursuant to the Sino-British Joint Declaration of 1984 and the Sino-Portuguese Joint Declaration of 1987. Pursuant to their Joint Declarations, which are binding inter-state treaties registered with the United Nations, and their Basic laws, the Chinese SARs "shall enjoy a high degree of autonomy". Generally, the two SARs are not considered to constitute a part of Mainland China, by both SAR and mainland Chinese authorities.

The provision to establish special administrative regions appeared in the constitution in 1982, in anticipation of the talks with the United Kingdom over the question of the sovereignty over Hong Kong. It was envisioned as the model for the eventual unification with Taiwan and other islands, where the Republic of China has resided since 1949.

Under the one country, two systems principle, the Chinese Central Government is responsible for the diplomatic, military and other state-level affairs of the two SARs. But two SARs continue to possess their own multi-party legislatures, legal systems, police forces, separate customs territory, immigration policies, left-hand traffic, official languages, academic and educational systems, representation on certain international bodies and representation in international competitions, and other aspects that falls within the autonomous level.

Special administrative regions should not be confused with special economic zones, which are areas in which special economic laws apply to promote trade and investments. The Wolong Special Administrative Region in Sichuan province is a nature reserve, and not a political division.

List of special administrative regions of China 
There are currently two special administrative regions established according to Article 31 of the Chinese Constitution. For the Wolong Special Administrative Region in Sichuan Province, please see the section Wolong below.

Characteristics 

The two special administrative regions of Hong Kong and Macau (created in 1997 and 1999 respectively) each have a codified constitution called Basic Law. The law provides the regions with a high degree of autonomy, a separate political system, and a capitalist economy under the principle of "one country, two systems" proposed by Deng Xiaoping.

High degree of autonomy 
Currently, the two SARs of Hong Kong and Macau are responsible for all affairs except those regarding diplomatic relations and national defence. Consequently, the National People's Congress authorises the SAR to exercise a high degree of autonomy and enjoy executive, legislative and independent judicial powers, and each with their own Courts of Final Appeal.

Currency  
Renminbi: The currency is commonly abbreviated as CNY¥. Adopt a stable exchange rate.
Hong Kong dollar：The currency is commonly abbreviated as HK$. The exchange rate is pegged to the US dollar.
Macanese pataca: The currency is commonly abbreviated as MOP$. The exchange rate is pegged to the Hong Kong dollar.

External affairs 

Special administrative regions are empowered to contract a wide range of agreements with other countries and territories such as mutual abolition of visa requirement, mutual legal aid, air services, extradition, handling of double taxation and others, with no Chinese government involvement. However, in some diplomatic talks involving a SAR, the SAR concerned may choose to send officials to be part of the Chinese delegation. For example, when former Director of Health of Hong Kong Margaret Chan became the World Health Organization (WHO) Director-General, she served as a delegate from the People's Republic of China to the WHO.

At the same time they are members of various international organizations such as WTO, APEC, etc.

 Hong Kong participates in 41 intergovernmental international organizations with countries as participating units.
 Hong Kong participates in 54 intergovernmental international organizations that do not use countries as their participating units.

 Macau participates in 19 intergovernmental international organizations with countries as participating units.
 Macau participates in 30 intergovernmental international organizations that do not use countries as their participating units.

The Government of Hong Kong and Government of Macao has established Hong Kong Economic and Trade Offices (HKETOs) and Delegação Económica e Comercial de Macaus (DECM),  in some countries as well as Greater China Region. HKETOs serve as a quasi-interests section in favour of Hong Kong. DECMs serve as a quasi-interests section in favour of Macao. For regions with no HKETOs and DECM, Chinese diplomatic missions take charge of protecting Hong Kong-related and Macau-related interests.

Some countries which have a diplomatic relationship with the central Chinese government maintain Consulate-General offices in Hong Kong and Macau.

Olympic Games 

In sporting events such as the Olympic Games or  Asian Games, the SARs may have their own independent teams. They participate under the respective names of "Hong Kong, China" and "Macau, China", and compete as different entities as they had done since they were under foreign rules, but both SARs are usually allowed to omit the term ", China" for informal use.

Defence and military 
The People's Liberation Army is garrisoned in both SARs. PRC authorities have said the PLA will not be allowed to interfere with the local affairs of Hong Kong and Macau, and must abide by its laws. In 1988, scholar Chen Fang of the Academy of Military Science even tried to propose the "One military, two systems" concept to separate the defence function and public functions in the army. The PLA does not participate in the governance of the SAR but the SAR may request them for civil-military participation, in times of emergency such as natural disasters. Defence is the responsibility of the PRC government.

A 1996 draft PRC law banned People's Liberation Army–run businesses in Hong Kong, but loopholes allow them to operate while the profits are ploughed back into the military. There are many PLA-run corporations in Hong Kong. The PLA also have sizeable land holdings in Hong Kong worth billions of dollars.

Immigration and nationality 
Each of the SARs issues passports on its own to its permanent residents who are concurrently Chinese (PRC) citizens. PRC citizens must also satisfy one of the following conditions:

 born in the SAR;
 born anywhere while either parent was a permanent resident of the SAR;
 resided continuously and legally for seven or more years in the SAR and therefore gained a right of abode in the SAR.

Apart from affording the holder consular protection by the Ministry of Foreign Affairs of the People's Republic of China, these passports also specify that the holder has right of abode in the issuing SAR.

The National People's Congress has also put each SAR in charge of administering the PRC's Nationality Law in its respective realms, namely naturalisation, renunciation and restoration of PRC nationality and issuance of proof of nationality.

Due to their colonial past, many inhabitants of the SARs hold some form of non-Chinese nationality (e.g. British National (Overseas) status, British citizenship, British Overseas citizenship or Portuguese citizenship). However, SAR residents who are Chinese descent have always been considered as Chinese citizens by the PRC authorities, an exception to this case is Macau, wherein residents of Chinese descent may choose Chinese or Portuguese nationality. Special interpretation of the Nationality Law, while not recognising dual nationality, has allowed Chinese citizens to keep their foreign "right of abode" and use travel documents issued by the foreign country. However, such travel documents cannot be used to travel to mainland China and persons concerned must use Home Return Permit. Therefore, master nationality rule applies so the holder may not enjoy consular protection while in mainland China. Chinese citizens who also have foreign citizenship may declare a change of nationality at the Immigration Department of the respective SARs, and upon approval, would no longer be considered Chinese citizens.

SAR permanent residents who are not Chinese citizens (including stateless persons) are not eligible for SAR passports. Persons who hold a non-Chinese citizenship must obtain passports from foreign diplomatic missions which represents their countries of citizenship. For those who are stateless, each SAR may issue its own form of certificates of identity, e.g. Document of Identity, in lieu of national passports to the persons concerned. Chinese citizens who are non-permanent residents of two SARs are also ineligible for SAR passports but may obtain CIs just like stateless persons.

Passport
 Chinese passport (for the Mainland residents with Hukou only)
 Hong Kong SAR passport (for Hong Kong permanent residents with Chinese citizenship only)
 Macao SAR passport (for Macau permanent residents with Chinese citizenship only)

Comparisons

Offer to Taiwan and other ROC-controlled areas 

The status of a special administrative region for Taiwan and other areas controlled by the Republic of China (ROC) was first proposed in 1981. The 1981 proposal was put forth by NPC chairman Ye Jianying called "Ye's nine points". A series of different offers have since appeared. On 25 June 1983 Deng Xiaoping appeared at Seton Hall University in the US to propose "Deng's six points", which called for a "Taiwan Special Administrative Region". It was envisioned that after Taiwan's unification with the PRC as an SAR, the PRC would become the sole representative of China. Under this proposal, Taiwan would be guaranteed its own military, its own administrative and legislative powers, an independent judiciary and the right of adjudication, although it would not be considered a separate government of China.

In 2005 the Anti-Secession Law of the PRC was enacted. It promises the lands currently ruled by the authorities of Taiwan a high degree of autonomy, among other things. The PRC can also employ non-peaceful means and other necessary measures to defend its claims to sovereignty over the ROC's territories in the event of an outright declaration of independence by Taiwan (ROC).

In January 2019, the 40-year anniversary of a statement made by the PRC to Taiwan in 1979, Chinese Communist Party general secretary Xi Jinping outlined in a speech how the "one country, two systems" principle would be applied to Taiwan. Several major points from the speech include:

 Taiwan would be a special administrative region of China, and part of the PRC. The ROC would no longer exist.
 Taiwan's institutions would metamorphose into sub-national bodies.
 Taiwan's social system and economic lifestyle would be respected.
 Taiwan's private property rights, belief systems, and "legitimate rights and interests" would be safeguarded.
 The "Taiwan issue" should not be passed down from generation to generation (i.e. reunification should be done promptly).
 The reunification of Taiwan would lead to the "great rejuvenation of the Chinese nation".

Wolong 
The Wolong Special Administrative Region is located in the southwest of Wenchuan County, Ngawa Tibetan and Qiang Autonomous Prefecture of Sichuan. It was formerly known as Wolong Special Administrative Region of Wenchuan County, Sichuan Province and was founded in March 1983 with approval of the State Council. It was given its current name and placed under Sichuan provincial government with administrative supervision by the provincial department of forestry. Its area supersedes Sichuan Wolong National Nature Reserve and its administrative office is the same as the Administrative Bureau of the State Forestry Administration for the reserve. It currently has a population of 5,343.

Despite its name, the Wolong Special Administrative Region is not an SAR as defined by Article 31 of the Constitution of the People's Republic of China. This is primarily because the Wolong Special Administrative Region was established with the approval of the State Council, rather than "by law enacted by the National People's Congress" as stipulated in Article 31 of the Constitution.

Defunct SARs 
In the Republic of China (ROC) era between 1912 and 1949, the "special administrative regions" were historically used to designate special areas by the Beiyang government, most of which were eventually converted into provinces by the Nationalist government in 1928. All were de facto suspended or abolished after the end of the Chinese Civil War, with the establishment of the People's Republic of China (PRC) and the ROC government's retreat to Taiwan (a former Japanese colony taken by the ROC in 1945 after World War II), but these continued to exist as provinces de jure. The regions were:

See also 

 Autonomous regions of China
 Constitution of the People's Republic of China
 Federacy
 History of Hong Kong
 British Hong Kong
 History of Macau
 Portuguese Macau

Notes

References 

 
Province-level divisions of China
Territorial disputes of the Republic of China